The 1978–79 UC Irvine Anteaters men's basketball team represented the University of California, Irvine during the 1978–79 NCAA Division I men's basketball season. This was the program's second season in Division I and 14th season overall. The Anteaters were led by tenth year head coach Tim Taft and played their home games at Crawford Hall as members of the Pacific Coast Athletic Association. They finished the season 9–17 and were 3–11 in PCAA play to finish 8th place.

Previous season 
In their inaugural season as a Division I program, the 1977–78 Anteaters finished with a record of 8–17 and 2–12 PCAA play. The anteaters struggled for the remainder of the season, going 3–12, and ended the year on a six-game losing streak.

Off-season

Incoming transfer

1978 Recruiting Class

Source:

Roster

Schedule and results

|-
!colspan=12 style="background:#002244; color:#FFDE6C;"| Regular season

|-
!colspan=9 style="background:#002244; color:#FFDE6C;"| PCAA tournament

Source

Awards and honors
Louis Bremond 
PCAA All-Freshman Team

Notes

References

UC Irvine
UC Irvine Anteaters men's basketball seasons
UC Irvine Anteaters
UC Irvine Anteaters